Stolzite is a mineral, a lead tungstate; with the formula PbWO4.  It is similar to, and often associated with, wulfenite which is the same chemical formula except that the tungsten is replaced by molybdenum.  Stolzite crystallizes in the tetragonal crystal system and is dimorphous with the monoclinic form raspite.

Lead tungstate crystals have the optical transparency of glass combined with much higher density (8.28 g/cm3 vs ~2.2 g/cm3 for fused silica). They are used as scintillators in particle physics because of their short radiation length (0.89 cm), low Molière radius (2.2 cm), quick scintillation response, and radiation hardness. Lead tungstate crystals are used in the Compact Muon Solenoid's electromagnetic calorimeter.

It was first described in 1820 by August Breithaupt, who called it Scheelbleispath and then by François Sulpice Beudant in 1832, who called it scheelitine. In 1845, Wilhelm Karl Ritter von Haidinger coined the name stolzite for an occurrence in Krusne Hory (Erzgebirge), Czech Republic, naming it after Joseph Alexi Stolz of Teplice in Bohemia.  It occurs in oxidized hydrothermal tungsten-lead ore deposits typically in association with raspite, cerussite, anglesite, pyromorphite and mimetite.

See also
List of minerals
List of minerals named after people

References

Mellor, J. W. "A Comprehensive Treatise on Inorganic and Theoretical Chemistry," Vol.11, Longmans, Green and Co., London, 1931, p. 792.

Lead minerals
Tungstate minerals
Tetragonal minerals
Minerals in space group 88
Luminescent minerals